Degelen is a mountain massif in the Abai Region, Kazakhstan.

The Balapan nuclear test site lies to the northeast.

History
At the time of the Kazakh SSR Degelen was part of the Semipalatinsk Test Site complex. Around hundred horizontal tunnels were bored into the mountain to carry out nuclear tests operated by the USSR armed forces. The mountain massif was the location chosen for the majority of the subcritical and supercritical tests. 215 underground nuclear explosions were carried out.

In 1991, following the dissolution of the Soviet Union, the site was taken over by the government of Kazakhstan. The tunnels were closed in 1993. The abandoned electrical installations and the rails that had been used to transport the nuclear devices deep into the earth became a target of scavengers. Pillaging of copper and iron went on despite the safety measures at the site. Some of the tunnels were stocked with undetonated plutonium and they had to be sealed more thoroughly as part of a plan to eliminate nuclear weapons testing infrastructure in the mountain range.

Geography   
Degelen is part of the Kazakh Upland system (Saryarka). It is a compact-shaped range of moderate altitude located in the northeastern sector of the highlands.

There are many fresh water springs in the mountains and the slopes are cut by ravines. The Kalybai pass is at the western end of the valley. North flowing river Karabulak and east flowing Uzynbulak have their sources in the Degelen.

Flora
The slopes of the massif are covered with steppe vegetation, including sedges, sagebrush and fescue. The narrow valleys have dense bush growth and birch, aspen-birch, and poplar-aspen forest. The soil and water of the area are still under radioactive contamination. In order to assess recovery, experimental zones have been planted with poplar, silver birch, Tatar maple and elm seedlings.

See also
Geography of Kazakhstan
List of nuclear test sites

References

External links
Plutonium Mountain - The National Security Archive
Tours to Semipalatinsk nuclear test site. Tours in East Kazakhstan
Omega-1 Seismic Experiment at Degelen

Kazakh Uplands
Nuclear test sites in Kazakhstan
Soviet nuclear weapons testing